The Muddy River is a  tributary of Sebago Lake in the U.S. state of Maine.

See also
List of rivers of Maine

References

Maine Streamflow Data from the USGS
Maine Watershed Data From Environmental Protection Agency

Rivers of Cumberland County, Maine
Rivers of Maine